Outlit is an online social networking and digital media virtual marketplace founded in 2014 in Arlington, Virginia. Registered users can publish stories and earn from views by other users. Outlit offers bloggers and publishers three sources of revenue for their content: a share of digital advertising revenue, on-demand digital payments, and subscriptions. The service launched in 2014 as an "iTunes of News,"  with over 40 newspapers and magazines in the United States. Outlit announced an expansion in 2019 to become a social information marketplace enabling anyone to publish and earn from other users. Content on Outlit comes in the form of short posts with longer content able to be monetized through ads, direct digital micropayments, or subscriptions.

History 
The company's CEO and co-founder is Lucien Zeigler, a media consultant and economist. Zeigler has said that Outlit was founded in response to declining revenues for publishers and the prevalence of advertising in news media, as well as the "inefficiency of the subscription business model" for readers.

Outlit is backed by an undisclosed angel investment secured in March 2015.

References

Digital media organizations
American companies established in 2014
Online marketplaces of the United States
2014 establishments in Virginia